Eric Czerniewski (born March 5, 1988) is an American football quarterback who won the Harlon Hill Trophy as the top player in the NCAA Division II in 2010 in his senior year at University of Central Missouri.

High school
Czerniewski was born in Montgomery City, Missouri.  He led his Montgomery County High School to its first  Class 2 State Championship game in 2005.  He set state records for completions (775), attempts (1,235), yards (11,557), and touchdowns (140) in a career. He also set those records for a single season, going 285-of-452 for 4,407 yards and 52 touchdowns compared to only six interceptions.  He married his high school sweetheart Danielle in 2010.

College
He was the nation's fourth-ranked passer with an average of 371.9 yards per game.  He was the leading passer in Division II with 5,207 total passing yards and 46 touchdown passes.  His passing yardage would be a record in all but Division I FBS. He completed 447 of 670 pass attempts and had a 66.7 completion percentage.  During his career at Central Missouri he had 12,847 passing yards, 107 career touchdown passes and 1,043 career pass completions—all records in the Mid-America Intercollegiate Athletics Association.

Czerniewski led Central Missouri to its first ever quarterfinals in NCAA Division II where it lost to defending national champion Northwest Missouri State which was led quarterback Blake Bolles who also one of three finalists for the award.  The third finalist was Zach Amedro from West Liberty University and was also a finalist in 2009.  Czerniewski received 164 total points to Amedro's 158—the closest vote in the award's 25-year history.  Bolles was a distant third with 64 points.

In January 2011 he was named the most valuable offensive player in the Cactus Bowl Division II All Star Game after passing for 187 yards and two touchdowns.

Statistics

Note: Uses NCAA (rather than NFL) passer rating model

References

1988 births
Central Missouri Mules football players
American football quarterbacks
Living people
People from Montgomery City, Missouri
Players of American football from Missouri